Thomas von Westen Engelhart (6 October 1850 - 3 August 1905) was a Norwegian jurist and politician for the Liberal Party.

Biography
He was born at Vinger in Hedmark, Norway. He graduated in 1871 with a law degree. Engelhart was a public prosecutor by profession.
He was a senior prosecutor at Kongsvinger from 1873. From 1876 he was the Supreme Court Attorney at Vinger, where he also was the mayor between 1881 and 1889.

He was Minister of Auditing from 1891–1892, a member of the Council of State Division in Stockholm from 1892-1893 and 1897–1898, and then Minister of the Interior from 1895–1897. He served as county governor  (amtmann) in Bratsberg amt from 1898-1902 and then county governor of Jarlsberg og Larvik amt from 1902 until his death in 1905.

His son Bernt (1889–1961) was a veterinarian, and married schoolteacher Alette Nicolaysen who became a national housewives' leader. His daughter Engelke (1885–1973) married ship-owner Wilhelm Wilhelmsen.

References

1850 births
1905 deaths
Politicians from Kongsvinger
Norwegian jurists
Government ministers of Norway
County governors of Norway